A Real Bloke is a 1935 British drama film directed by John Baxter and starring George Carney, Mary Clare and Diana Beaumont. It was made at Cricklewood Studios as a quota quickie for release by MGM.

Cast
 George Carney as Bill  
 Mary Clare as Kate  
 Diana Beaumont as Mary  
 Peggy Novak as Lil  
 Mark Daly as Scotty  
 Billy Holland  as Joe  
 Wilson Coleman as Watchman  
 Roddy Hughes as Taffy  
 Edgar Driver as Titch  
 C. Denier Warren as Tailor 
 Dick Francis 
 Johnnie Schofield 
 John Turnbull 
 Freddie Watts 
 Fred Wynne

References

Bibliography
 Chibnall, Steve. Quota Quickies: The Birth of the British 'B' Film. British Film Institute, 2007.
 Low, Rachael. Filmmaking in 1930s Britain. George Allen & Unwin, 1985.
 Wood, Linda. British Films, 1927-1939. British Film Institute, 1986.

External links

1935 films
British drama films
1935 drama films
1930s English-language films
Films directed by John Baxter
Quota quickies
Films set in England
Films shot at Cricklewood Studios
British black-and-white films
1930s British films